Joseph Biddle Wilkinson Jr. (February 20, 1845 – October 23, 1915) was a member of the Board of General Appraisers.

Education and career

Born on February 20, 1845, in Pointe Celeste Plantation, Plaquemines Parish, Louisiana, Wilkinson attended the Virginia Military Institute and served as a lieutenant in the Confederate States Army from 1861 to 1865, during the American Civil War. After the war, he was a planter in Plaquemines Parish from 1865 to 1885. He served as Chief Clerk for the New Orleans Customs House from 1866 to 1890.

Federal judicial service

Wilkinson was nominated by President Benjamin Harrison on July 2, 1890, to the Board of General Appraisers, to a new seat created by 26 Stat. 131. He was confirmed by the United States Senate on July 16, 1890, and received his commission the same day. His service terminated on December 15, 1899, due to his resignation. He was succeeded by Marion De Vries.

Death

Wilkinson died on October 23, 1915, in Myrtle Grove Plantation, Waterproof, Tensas Parish, Louisiana.

Family

Wilkinson was the great-grandson of James Wilkinson.

References

Sources
 

1845 births
1915 deaths
People from Plaquemines Parish, Louisiana
Virginia Military Institute alumni
Confederate States Army officers
Members of the Board of General Appraisers
United States Article I federal judges appointed by Benjamin Harrison
19th-century American judges
People of Louisiana in the American Civil War